Ronald Thomas Locke (born April 4, 1942 in Wakefield, Rhode Island) is a retired American professional baseball player.

As a Met, Locke was credited with the win in one game, the loss in two others, and posted an earned run average of 3.48. In 41⅓ innings pitched, he allowed 46 hits and 22 bases on balls, registering 17 strikeouts. His victory came on August 2 against the Houston Colt .45s at Shea Stadium. Given the starting assignment by his manager, Casey Stengel, Locke surrendered five hits and two earned runs over seven innings, and earned credit for the Mets' 4–2 win. Willard Hunter got the save.

Having begun his minor league career in 1963, he continued in the minors through 1970, briefly joining the Cincinnati Reds' and Philadelphia Phillies' systems in 1966 before returning to the Mets' organization, where he finished his career.  He compiled a minor league record of 62 wins and 48 losses, with a 3.05 ERA. In his rookie season, with the Class A Auburn Mets of the New York–Penn League in 1963, Locke struck out 249 men in 217 innings pitched, and won 18 games.

References

External links

1942 births
Living people
Auburn Mets players
Baseball players from Rhode Island
Buffalo Bisons (minor league) players
Jacksonville Suns players
Macon Peaches players
Major League Baseball pitchers
Memphis Blues players
New York Mets players
People from Washington County, Rhode Island
People from South Kingstown, Rhode Island
Tidewater Tides players
Williamsport Mets players